John Ernest Abbey (born 8 July 1945) is a British-born record label owner, record producer, music agent and writer, who has been based in the United States since the 1970s.

Biography
He was born in London.  In 1966 he founded the magazine initially called Home of the Blues, but soon renamed as Blues & Soul.  The magazine became the leading black music journal in the UK, and Abbey remained its editor until the late 1970s.  Abbey founded Action Records in London in 1968, and Contempo Records in 1973.  The labels licensed R&B recordings from independent US labels for release in the UK, and Contempo had hits with Tami Lynn's "I'm Gonna Run Away From You", and Dorothy Moore's "Misty Blue" and "Funny How Time Slips Away".  Abbey also worked as European A&R and promotions manager for Atlantic and Stax Records, promoting such artists as Aretha Franklin, Isaac Hayes and the Staple Singers to British and European audiences.

He married singer Tamiko Jones in 1977, and moved to Atlanta, Georgia, in 1978.  He set up international tours for musicians including Curtis Mayfield and Clarence Carter.   Abbey and Jones later divorced, and Abbey married Nina Easton, who had worked for CBS in Scandinavia.  The pair established Ichiban Records in Atlanta in 1985, with a roster that expanded from soul music into blues, gospel, rock and hip-hop.  Ichiban closed in the late 1990s.

Abbey later managed The Three Degrees.  In 2015, he was appointed CEO of Connor Ray Music, based in Houston, Texas, responsible for artists including Trudy Lynn.

References

External links
 John Abbey at Rock's Back Pages

1945 births
Living people
English writers about music
English record producers
British music industry executives
British expatriates in the United States